Gorytvesica homora is a species of moth of the family Tortricidae. It is found in Napo Province, Ecuador.

The wingspan is 18 mm. The wings are ferruginous, strigulated (finely streaked), reticulated (a net-like pattern) and suffused with brown. The hindwings are brown, slightly paler basally.

Etymology
The species name refers to the similarity to Gorytvesica homaema and is derived from Greek  (meaning neighbouring).

References

Moths described in 2005
Euliini
Moths of South America
Taxa named by Józef Razowski